Kyle James Brady (born January 14, 1972) is a former professional American football player. He played tight end for 13 seasons in the National Football League (NFL) for the New York Jets, Jacksonville Jaguars and New England Patriots. He was the Jets' first round draft choice in the 1995 NFL Draft. He played college football at Penn State.

Early years
Brady attended Highland Elementary School, Lemoyne Middle School, and Cedar Cliff High School, all in the West Shore School District. While attending Cedar Cliff in Camp Hill, Pennsylvania, Brady lettered in football, basketball, and baseball. In football, he was a first-team USA Today All-USA selection, a Parade Magazine All-America selection and, as a senior, was the Gatorade Pennsylvania Player of the Year, and the recipient of the Bobby Dodd Award (which is given to the nation's top offensive lineman) given by the Touchdown Club of Atlanta.  In Brady’s Junior season at Cedar Cliff he scored the lone touchdown in a 14-7 loss to Pittsburgh Central Catholic in the 1988 Pennsylvania State AAAA Championship game played at Penn State University.

College career
At Penn State, Brady was a two-time All-Big Ten selection, and a consensus All-America choice as a senior, catching 27 passes for 365 yards and 2 touchdowns. During his senior year in 1994, he helped his team to an undefeated record, a conference championship, and the school's first Rose Bowl victory. He was ranked seventh in the all-time reception list for the school.  Brady finished his four seasons with 76 receptions for 940 yards and 9 touchdowns. He graduated with a degree in exercise and sports science in 1995.

Professional career

New York Jets
Brady was selected by the New York Jets in the first round (9th overall) of the 1995 NFL Draft, much to the chagrin of the Jets fans in attendance. The fans wanted the team to draft future Hall of Famer Warren Sapp and showed it by chanting "We want Sapp! We want Sapp!". After Brady was announced, Joe Theismann said "It just doesn't seem to make sense", speculating that Rich Kotite wanted two tight ends on the field. Jets fans booed Brady and his mother when they appeared on the stage. Although Brady became what NFL Films later described as a "solid player", fans did not forget the team not choosing Sapp.

Jacksonville Jaguars
Brady went on to sign with the Jacksonville Jaguars in 1999 and had his best year in the NFL with the Jaguars. In the 2000 season,  he set career highs with 64 receptions and 729 receiving yards. He was the Jaguars' Man of the Year in 2003. Brady had a reputation with the Jags as a very durable player, having only missed nine games in his twelve seasons in the NFL, and was also known as an outstanding blocker.

New England Patriots
His reputation as a durable blocker helped him to land a two-year contract on March 3, 2007 with the New England Patriots to replace departing free agent Daniel Graham at tight end. Bill Belichick had wanted to draft Brady in 1995 as head coach of the Cleveland Browns with the 10th pick. When Brady was selected, Belichick traded down to the 30th pick. One website went as far as to label Brady "Belichick's white whale."

Despite nagging injuries, Brady played in 14 games for the Patriots in 2007, catching nine passes for 70 yards and two touchdowns, culminating with Super Bowl XLII. He was released by New England on February 29, 2008, and retired shortly thereafter.

Broadcasting
Brady was a participant in the NFL Business Management and Entrepreneurial Program, a two-week program held at the top American business schools for NFL players preparing for careers after football. Brady attended the workshop at the Wharton School of the University of Pennsylvania in February and March 2008. In June 2009, Brady took part in the 2009 NFL/NFLPA "Broadcast Boot Camp," a program designed by the NFL Broadcasting Department and their broadcast partners to prepare players for possible post-playing careers in broadcasting.

Brady was an analyst for NFL Europe before being hired by the Big Ten Network as a football analyst for the 2009 season, where he was partnered with Rick Pizzo on the Big Ten Football Saturday: Pre-Game Show.

Law
Brady became a licensed financial advisor in 2009 and worked at First Florida Credit Union before enrolling at the Florida Coastal School of Law in Jacksonville, Florida, in 2010. He graduated in May 2013, interned with Holland & Knight, and passed the bar later that year. He planned to use his combined financial and legal training to advise former NFL players on how to avoid financial pitfalls, along with real estate, securities law and estate planning.

Personal life
Brady and his wife Kristin have three children. They live in Atlantic Beach, Florida.

Brady's father John Brady was born in Chadwell Heath, Romford, Essex, UK. He played Minor League Baseball for two seasons.

Brady traced his Irish roots to Ballinagh co. Cavan, Turlough Co. Mayo and Tierneevin and Ballingarry Co. Galway.

His grandfather, great grandfather and great great grandfather were members of the Royal Irish Constabulary

A 2004 Sports Illustrated article noted Brady is a U.S. Civil War buff.

In 2004 Brady earned his pilot's license.

On March 21, 2009, he threw out the first pitch at opening day ceremonies for the Green Cove Springs Athletic Association Little League Baseball. He served as honorary chairman of the 2009 Big 33 Football Classic.

On June 24, 2014, he was selected as honorary chairman for the Global Ireland Football Tournament

Notes and references

External links
New England Patriots bio
"Law & Order: Former Jaguar Kyle Brady ready for life after football", Gene Frenette, The Florida Times-Union, September 11, 2013.

1972 births
Living people
Players of American football from Harrisburg, Pennsylvania
American football tight ends
Penn State Nittany Lions football players
New York Jets players
Jacksonville Jaguars players
New England Patriots players
Florida Coastal School of Law alumni
People from Atlantic Beach, Florida
Holland & Knight people
American people of Irish descent
People from Camp Hill, Pennsylvania